Olivier Pastré (born 1950) is a French banker and economist. He serves as Chairman of IM Bank and as a professor of economics at Paris 8 University.

Biography

Early life
Olivier Pastré was born on 15 December 1950 in Neuilly-sur-Seine near Paris in France. He received a Master of Arts degree in economics from the University of Rhode Island. He went on to receive a PhD in economics from the University of Paris, followed by the Agrégation in economics.

Career
He serves as chairman of the board of directors of IM Bank, a Tunisian bank. He also serves on the Board of Directors of CMP Banque, a French bank. He previously served as the Managing Director of GP Banque. He also served on the Board of Directors of Union Bank, an Algerian bank, as well as Medifin and MSIN, two Moroccan companies. Additionally, he serves on the board of the Banking Directors Association.

He was Professor of Economics at Paris 13 University from 1978 to 1983. He is now Professor of Economics at Paris 8 University. He is a member of the Cercle des économistes, a French think tank. He is also a Fellow of the Europlace Institute of Finance.

Personal life
He is married, and has two children.

Bibliography
La Stratégie Internationale des Banques Américaines (1979).
La Crise du XX (1980).
Les Nouveaux Piliers de la Finance (1992).
La Banque (1997).
Où va l'économie mondiale ? (2002).
Le Capitalisme Déboussolé (2003).
La Nouvelle Economie Bancaire (2005).
La Méthode Colbert (2006).
La Guerre Mondiale des Banques (2007).
Le Roman vrai de la Crise financière (2008).
Sorties de Crise (2009).
On nous ment (2011).

References

1950 births
People from Neuilly-sur-Seine
University of Rhode Island alumni
University of Paris alumni
Academic staff of the University of Paris
French bankers
French corporate directors
French economists
French non-fiction writers
Living people
French male non-fiction writers